The 2013 Dunlop MSA Formula Ford Championship of Great Britain was a multi-event, open-wheel single seater motor racing championship held across England and Scotland. The championship featured a mix of professional motor racing teams and privately funded drivers, competing in Formula Ford cars that conform to the technical regulations for the championship. This season saw the championship adopt a single class format, with all drivers using the latest cars built to the Formula Ford EcoBoost specification. There was also an award for the highest placed rookie. It was the 37th British Formula Ford season and returned to the TOCA tour to form part of the extensive program of support categories built up around the BTCC centrepiece.

The season commenced on 31 March at Brands Hatch – on the circuit's Indy configuration – and concluded on 13 October at the same venue, utilising the Grand Prix circuit, after thirty races to be held at ten meetings, all in support of the 2013 British Touring Car Championship.

Championship changes
Along with the move to support the BTCC, the championship underwent several other technical changes. The championship adopted the new Formula Ford EcoBoost 200 regulations, which included an increase in the EcoBoost engine power from the previous season, along with the new addition of a fully adjustable aerodynamic package which includes front and rear wings previously never seen before in the British Formula Ford Championship. In late October 2012, the series organisers announced that from this season Duratec class cars will be ineligible for the championship, leaving only the EcoBoost class.

Drivers and teams
All teams are British-registered.

Race calendar and results
The provisional calendar was announced by the BTCC organisers on 29 August 2012.

Championship standings

Drivers' Championship

Constructors Cup
(key)

Nations Cup
(key)

Notes

References

External links
 The home of the British Formula Ford Championship

British Formula Ford Championship seasons
Formula Ford
British Formula Ford